Vyacheslav Ionov (June 26, 1940 – June 25, 2012) was a Soviet sprint canoeist who competed in the mid-1960s. He won a gold in the K-4 1000 m event at the 1964 Summer Olympics in Tokyo. Ionov also won a gold medal in the K-4 10000 m event at the 1966 ICF Canoe Sprint World Championships in East Berlin. He was born in Moscow.

References

External links

Vyacheslav Ionov at Infosport.ru  
Vyacheslav Ionov at Sport-strana.ru 

1940 births
2012 deaths
Sportspeople from Moscow
Canoeists at the 1964 Summer Olympics
Olympic canoeists of the Soviet Union
Olympic gold medalists for the Soviet Union
Olympic medalists in canoeing
ICF Canoe Sprint World Championships medalists in kayak
Soviet male canoeists
Russian male canoeists

Medalists at the 1964 Summer Olympics